Mashal University is private university established in 2009, located in the city of Kabul, Afghanistan.

Notable graduates 
 Mina Mangal

References

External links
Mashal University

Educational institutions established in 2009
Universities and colleges in Kabul
Universities in Afghanistan
2009 establishments in Afghanistan
Private universities in Afghanistan